The 1968 LSU Tigers football team represented Louisiana State University during the 1968 NCAA University Division football season. The offense scored 221 points while the defense allowed 171 points. The Tigers competed in the inaugural Peach Bowl and beat Florida State, 31–27.

Schedule
The games vs. TCU and Tulane were designated as conference games by the SEC, since LSU had only four conference opponents on its schedule. Under SEC rules at the time, teams had to play a minimum of six conference games to be eligible for the championship. This rule was repealed in 1969, but reinstated in 1972.

Roster

Team players drafted into the NFL

References

LSU
LSU Tigers football seasons
Peach Bowl champion seasons
LSU Tigers football